Synchroa is a genus of synchroa bark beetles in the family Synchroidae. There are about six described species in Synchroa.

Species
These six species belong to the genus Synchroa:
 Synchroa chinensis Nikitsky, 1999 g
 Synchroa elongatula Nikitsky, 1999 g
 Synchroa melanotoides Lewis, 1895 g
 Synchroa punctata Newman, 1838 i c g b
 Synchroa quiescens Wickham, 1911 g
 Synchroina tenuipennis Fairmaire, 1898 g
Data sources: i=ITIS, c=Catalogue of Life, g=GBIF, b=Bugguide.net

References

Further reading

External links

 

Tenebrionoidea